Luke John Summerfield (born 6 December 1987) is an English professional footballer who plays as a central midfielder for National League club FC Halifax Town. He has played in the English Football League for Plymouth Argyle, AFC Bournemouth, Leyton Orient, Cheltenham Town, Shrewsbury Town, York City and Grimsby Town.

Early life
Summerfield was born in Ivybridge, Devon. His father, Kevin, is a former professional footballer and coach.

Career

Plymouth Argyle
Summerfield joined the Plymouth Argyle Centre of Excellence aged 10. He made his first-team debut in the last match of the 2004–05 season, a 0–0 home draw with Leicester City on 8 May 2005, entering the match as a 77th minute substitute for David Worrell. He signed a two-year professional contract with Plymouth on 1 August 2005, before the start of 2005–06. He made two appearances in his first two seasons for Argyle (both as a substitute), once in the league and once in the League Cup. Summerfield made his debut for Argyle, as a substitute, on 8 May 2005, against Leicester City. On his first start for Argyle, against Colchester United in the Championship, on 8 August 2006, during 2006–07, Summerfield scored with a long-range volley. In January 2007, Summerfield was listed at number five in The Guardians ten best prospects to watch out for in 2007. At the beginning of March 2007 he trained for a week with Premier League club Chelsea along with teammates Dan Gosling and Scott Sinclair.

Then Plymouth Argyle manager Ian Holloway said of Summerfield that "I see Luke doing things far beyond his tender years. The boy has a fine touch, he is typical of the talent that Plymouth will produce for the future." On 20 March 2007, Summerfield signed a loan deal with League One club AFC Bournemouth until the end of the season. On 25 September 2009, Summerfield moved to League One club Leyton Orient on a one-month loan, which was later extended to three months, before he returned to Plymouth on 19 December.

Cheltenham Town

Summerfield joined Shrewsbury Town on trial in July 2011 and played in a friendly against Manchester United, but he was not offered a contract and in August signed a one-year contract with Cheltenham Town. In July 2012, he rejected a new contract with the club.

Shrewsbury Town
Summerfield rejected a contract offer from Cheltenham Town to sign for League One club Shrewsbury Town on 3 July 2012. He scored his first goal for Shrewsbury in a 3–1 FA Cup defeat versus Hereford United at Edgar Street. He was released at the end of his contract in May 2014.

York City
Summerfield signed for League Two club York City on 30 June 2014 on a two-year contract. He made his debut in York's 1–1 away draw with Tranmere Rovers in the opening match of 2014–15 on 9 August 2014. He left York after rejecting a new contract in May 2016.

Grimsby Town
Summerfield signed a two-year contract with newly promoted League Two club Grimsby Town on 28 June 2016 on a free transfer. He scored his first goal for Grimsby in a 5–2 win against Stevenage on 27 August 2016.

On 6 February 2017, Summerfield joined National League club Macclesfield Town on loan until the end of 2016–17, with the option of a permanent transfer if Macclesfield were to earn promotion. He was offered a new contract by Grimsby at the end of the 2017–18 season, but left the club in June 2018 when it was withdrawn.

Wrexham
Summerfield signed for National League club Wrexham on 5 July 2018 on a one-year contract. He made his debut on 4 August on the opening day of the 2018–19 season, starting in a 1–0 away victory over Dover Athletic.

FC Halifax Town
On 20 August 2020, Summerfield signed for FC Halifax Town. On 11 January 2021, Summerfield was awarded with the league's Player of the Month award for December 2020.

Career statistics

HonoursMacclesfield Town'
FA Trophy runner-up: 2016–17

References

External links

Profile at the Wrexham A.F.C. website

1987 births
Living people
People from Ivybridge
Footballers from Devon
English footballers
Association football midfielders
Plymouth Argyle F.C. players
AFC Bournemouth players
Leyton Orient F.C. players
Cheltenham Town F.C. players
Shrewsbury Town F.C. players
York City F.C. players
Grimsby Town F.C. players
Macclesfield Town F.C. players
Wrexham A.F.C. players
FC Halifax Town players
English Football League players
National League (English football) players